On 24 January 2022, Yasmin Chkaifi was stabbed to death in London, United Kingdom. Her killer, Leon McCaskre, was killed by a passer-by minutes later.

Yasmin Chkaifi (1978 – 24 January 2022) was a 43-year-old Moroccan childminder who had two teenage sons and lived in Maida Vale, West London, England. At 9 am on 24 January 2022, she was stabbed to death on Chippenham Road, Maida Vale. Within minutes, her killer, Leon McCaskre, was killed when a 26-year-old stranger drove his car into him. McCaskre, who was 41, was Chkaifi's former long-term partner. A warrant for his arrest had been issued on 4 January after he failed to appear in court. The police arrested the driver on suspicion of murder and bailed him until late February. However, by 1 February the Metropolitan Police decided that the unnamed 26-year-old would face no further action, following a review of the evidence.

References

2022 in London
2022 murders in the United Kingdom
2020s in the City of Westminster
2020s murders in London
Crime in the City of Westminster
Deaths by person in London
January 2022 crimes in Europe
January 2022 events in the United Kingdom
Maida Vale
Stabbing attacks in London
Stabbing attacks in 2022
Moroccan people murdered abroad